ScriptSwitch Limited, now part of UnitedHealth UK, is a software company that develops and supplies a realtime decision support tool to GP surgeries in the United Kingdom. Its primary product, ScriptSwitch, is sold predominantly to NHS primary care organisations who use it to provide GPs with locally authored information and advice at the point of prescribing which can contain patient safety messages, drug switch recommendations and other information. As of April 2010, it is in use in more than 4,400 GP practices across 116 NHS Primary Care Organisations which covers 27 million patients  and is reported to save the NHS more than £20million per annum.

History of the company
ScriptSwitch Limited began life in early 2000 as a private partnership formed by Kelvin Acford, a retail pharmacist, Matthew, Anton, Duncan, Darren and Andrew all University of Warwick students to explore the initial idea of a decision support tool for General Practitioners.  After a successful incubation period of prototyping and refining the concept and expansion of the original team, the partners eventually formed a limited company that was then known as AKM Software Limited in 2001. AKM Software Limited's first real success came in early 2003 when it launched its first commercial product that was piloted in a number of GP practices. In order to raise external capital, expand operations and sales and provide a more focused direction, in mid-2003, a new company was created named ScriptSwitch Limited which absorbed all the assets of AKM Software Limited and has been trading under this name since.

ScriptSwitch Limited raised its first round of investment from venture capital firm MidVen in mid-2003 and in early 2006 was acquired by ISIS Equity Partners.

In late 2009, ScriptSwitch Limited was acquired by UnitedHealth UK, a subsidiary of US healthcare giant UnitedHealth Group for a reported £50m.

Awards

 ScriptSwitch Limited was awarded the prestigious Queen's Awards for Enterprise in the Innovation category in 2009.

References

External links
  Optum UK - Official website.

Technology companies of the United Kingdom
Software companies of the United Kingdom
Companies established in 2003
Technology companies established in 2003
Companies based in Coventry
Companies based in the West Midlands (county)
2003 establishments in the United Kingdom